Watauga Lake, located east of Elizabethton, Tennessee, is the local name of the Watauga Reservoir created by the Tennessee Valley Authority (TVA) with the 1948 completion of the TVA Watauga Dam.

History
Construction of Watauga Dam began in early 1942 but was curtailed later that year in favor of other World War II building efforts. Work on TVA Watauga  Dam resumed in 1946, and  finished  at the end of 1948, impounding  both the Watauga River and Elk River for the purposes of flood, hydropower generation and downstream navigation on the Tennessee River and Reservoir system.

The original town of Butler, Tennessee, now sits at the bottom of Watauga Lake. "New" Butler was relocated to higher ground above the summer pool edge of the TVA reservoir. Other nearby Tennessee cities and communities include Hampton, Elizabethton, Roan Mountain, Mountain City, Johnson City, and Bristol.

Watauga Lake covers parts of Johnson and Carter Counties.

Another much smaller nearby lake that is not part of the TVA system is the Ripshin Lake located  SW of Roan Mountain.

Specifications

At  the TVA summertime water level target "full pool", the lake surface covers 6,430 acres (26 km²) and the estimated depth of Watauga Lake is 265 feet (81 m) at the dam. At full pool, Watauga's elevation is the highest of all TVA lakes at 1,959 feet (597 m) above sea level.

Watauga Lake is regularly released by TVA schedule into Wilbur Reservoir (Wilbur Lake) and impounded by the TVA Wilbur Dam.

Recreation
More than half of Watauga Lake's shoreline lies within the Cherokee National Forest and cannot be developed. Recreational uses include boating, fishing, water-skiing, and camping. There is no horsepower limit or speed limit for boats operating on the lake. Several fee-based public and private boat launch ramps provide access on the Hampton side of the reservoir.

The release of impounded water from both TVA Watauga Dam and TVA Wilbur Dam provides additional downstream riverine recreational opportunities such as whitewater rafting, trout fishing, and kayaking on the Watauga River.

Several Cherokee National Forest recreations are location along its shores.

Houseboat owners have been conducting a large annual July 4 Boat Parade on Watauga Lake since 2001. The Watauga Lake boat parade starts at 2:00 p.m.

Connection with U.S. Interstate Highway System
(Travel to Watauga Dam and Watauga Dam Overlook):
 Interstate 26  Exit 24 at Johnson City then east 
  Tennessee State Route 67 to Elizabethton, then left at intersection of 
briefly on US321/US19E across Gilbert Peters Bridge over the Watauga River and onto
 Tennessee State Route 91 turning right onto Blue Springs Road and then to Watauga Dam.

(Travel to Watauga Lake opposite side of reservoir from Watauga Dam and Watauga Dam Overlook):
 Interstate 26  Exit 24 at Johnson City then east 
  Tennessee State Route 67 to Elizabethton, then left on
 Tennessee State Route 67 to Hampton and Watauga Lake.

Influence of weather

References

External links
Watauga Lake, Tennessee 
Watauga Lake map and trout stocking program information

Watauga River
Protected areas of Carter County, Tennessee
Protected areas of Johnson County, Tennessee
Reservoirs in Tennessee
Tennessee Valley Authority
Cherokee National Forest
Bodies of water of Carter County, Tennessee
Bodies of water of Johnson County, Tennessee
1948 establishments in Tennessee